Quercus ariifolia is a species of oak native to the Sierra Madre Oriental of Mexico.

Description
Quercus ariifolia belongs to the Quercus rugosa group of species. The species of this group are characterized by obovate, occasionally broadly obovate or oblanceolate, leaves, with a strongly rugose upper surface and with clustered trichomes on the lower surface.

Range and habitat
Quercus ariifolia is native to the southern Sierra Madre Oriental, where it is found in the states of Puebla, Hidalgo, Querétaro, and San Luis Potosí. It inhabits seasonally dry forests.

References

ariifolia
Flora of the Sierra Madre Oriental
Endemic oaks of Mexico
Taxa named by William Trelease